The National Assembly Party or NAAS is an opposition party of Saudi Arabia with members mostly in exile. 

Platform
NAAS is described as a pro-democracy group.

The group maintains that the country should be governed with the idea of separation of powers, calling for creation of an elected parliament and an independent judiciary based on a constitution approved by the people. According to the Middle East Eye, the group has not elaborated on its position on the fate of the current monarchy and the House of Saud in their proposed system. The NAAS spokesperson wrote an opinion on the publication titled "a vision for a democratic Saudi Arabia free from the house of Saud". 

The party criticizes Saudi Arabia's foreign policy towards countries in the region, terming it as "aggressive".

History
The idea of the opposition party was established through failed experiments or practices that preceded it (Islamist or Leftist), whether they were calling for political participation or separatism.

Membership
Yahya Assiri is the party's general-secretary and Madawi al-Rasheed serves as the spokesperson. In addition to the two, the party's inaugural statement was signed by Ahmed Almshikhs, Saeed al-Ghamdi, Abdullah al-Ouda (son of Salman al-Ouda) and Omar Al-Zahrani on behalf of the founders. Omar Abdulaziz is also a member.

See also
Committee for the Defense of Legitimate Rights, Saudi group created in 1993 that openly opposed the monarchy, based in Saudi Arabia

References

2020 establishments in Saudi Arabia
Political parties established in 2020
Political parties in Saudi Arabia
Saudi Arabian opposition groups